The Oxford College of Science is a science college located in Bangalore, India under The Oxford Educational Institutions. The Oxford College of science is accredited with "A" Grade by the National Assessment and Accreditation Council of India.

History

The Oxford College of Science was started in the year 1994 with twelve students and five teachers. Current vice principals are Dr Bharath S and Prof Gayathri Sudhir 

The Oxford College of Science was ranked first among private colleges in Karnataka by India Today for three consecutive years (2007, 2008 and 2009) and is ranked 25 amongst science colleges in India.

External links
 The Oxford Institutions

References

Colleges in Bangalore